Fernando is an unincorporated community in Round Grove Township, McLeod County, Minnesota, United States, near Stewart and Brownton.  The community is located near the junction of McLeod County Roads 7 and 17.

The community had a post office from 1899 to 1903.  Unusually, Fernando's post office was located in the creamery, with the buttermaker, Ferdinand W. Fenske, acting as postmaster.  The community was near a station along the former Chicago, Milwaukee, St. Paul and Pacific Railroad.

References

Unincorporated communities in McLeod County, Minnesota
Unincorporated communities in Minnesota